Elite Model Management (MM) refers to two independent chain modeling agencies that originated as one in Paris, France in 1972 with subsequent locations in New York, Los Angeles, Miami, London and Toronto. In 2004, the agencies in New York, Miami, Los Angeles and Toronto separated forming Elite Model Management North America.  Elite MM is a subsidiary of Elite World S.A., which main shareholder Silvio Scaglia controls his stake through managing company Elite World Group (EWG) where Elite MM is one of brands along with The Society Management (The Society), Women Management, Supreme Management, and Elite Model Look as well as Women 360 (W360) added in 2019.  Although Elite Model Management North America and Elite World Group share the logo, they have separate ownership and are not part of a business network.

History

Early years
Elite Model Management was founded in Paris in 1972 by John Casablancas (1942–2013) and Alain Kittler. Casablancas was inspired by his then-wife Jeanette Christiansen, former model and Miss Universe from Denmark, to open a model agency. Casablancas founded the model agency with his savings.

Elite Model opened with several high-profile models including Ingmari Lamy; Ann Schaufuss, Clive Arrowsmith's girlfriend; Barry Lategna's wife, Lynn Kohlman; Paula Brenken; and Paris Plannings Emanuelle Dano.

Expansion
At the time, boutique agencies in Paris and Milan fell out of favor with models due to payment issues. Models often found Parisian and Milanese model agencies holding their pay to coerce them into returning without work visas and work. British and American based chains gave models the financial security they needed. In 1977, Casablancas opened up Elite Models in New York. During the 1980s, New York endured the model wars. Despite agencies like Wilhelmina Models taking part in these wars, the primary battle was between Elite Models and Ford Models. Models such as Esmé Marshall left Elite for Ford Models. Casablancas alleged that Eileen Ford was out to get him and Ford responded with a $32.5 million suit. Until 1977, Ford was affiliated with Elite until Elite opened up offices in New York and began stealing Ford's models. Due to the death of Wilhelmina Cooper, models were in a panic bouncing from agency to agency. Even the highest paid black model at the time Beverly Johnson left Elite for Ford, only to return to Elite a week later.

Models such as Christie Brinkley and Anna Andersen sued Elite after they exited. In 1981, Elite Models formed a partnership with Models 1 which lasted until 1989. By 1983, Elite established the Elite Model Look, which was called The Look of the Year, Competition to rival its competitors Ford's Supermodel of the World Contest. The following year, the company expanded its offices in the U.S. with the formation of Elite Models Chicago, Elite Models Atlanta, Elite Models Los Angeles, Elite Models San Francisco, and Elite Models Miami. By 1986, Elite Models had twenty offices worldwide. In 1988, Elite opened offices in Milan.

From 1990 to 1999
Nicholas Farrae later purchased the agency in 1990. Elite World S.A. is the parent company of Elite Model Management (MM). The expansion of Elite Models furthered as Elite Models formed partnerships with already established agencies. In 1990, Elite Models formed a partnership with Model Management Heidi Gross in Hamburg. In 1992, Munich Models was formed and formed a partnership with Elite MM. 

In 1994, Elite MM sought to break into the Asian market and awarded its Greater China rights to Michel Lu.   In partnership with him they established Elite Models Hong Kong and China. In 1996, Lu went on to expand Elite MM to Singapore that served as a regional office for South East Asia. Similar to their debut in Paris, Elite swept up top local and regional talents such as Charmaine Harn, Junita Simon, Sonia Couling, and Nadya Hatagalung.

In 1999, a film was broadcast by the BBC showing the President of Elite MM, Gerald Marie, offering an undercover reporter sex for money. It was later proven that some images had been manipulated and the BBC admitted that its portrayal was unfair and had to make a substantial payout to the model agency. In the wake of this controversy, Casablancas left and formed the John Casablancas Modeling and Career Center in New York.

Elite World S.A.
Elite World SA was incorporated on Dec. 14, 1999 as an umbrella company and for licensing.  In 2002 Elite MM, along with several other New York model agencies, was sued for hundreds of millions of dollars in a class action that accused them of fixing fees for the past 30 years.  The following year, Elite opened offices in Asia. At the same time, an employee was awarded $5.2 million in a suit concerning passive smoking in the US office of Elite.

As a result of the bad publicity, the over expansion of Elite, and the loss of talents, Elite World SA filed for Chapter 11 bankruptcy in 2004. Elite Models New York was put up for auction and bought by Florida businessman Eddie Trump for $4.4 million, who asked Casablancas to come back and advise him.  Elite Models NY together with Los Angeles, Miami, and Toronto became Elite MM North America separate from Elite World SA. In August 2005, Elite World SA reestablished Elite MM in Singapore using it as the satellite office for their new South East Asia operation. Elite Models branches in Indonesia, Malaysia, Thailand, and Philippines were also added in August 2005. In October 2005, the Elite Model Look contest was added in Singapore.

By 2006, Casablancas' appointment was short-lived and Elite World SA went public on the Frankfurt Stock Exchange. In 2009, the president of Elite World SA (the parent company of Elite MM), Bertrand Hennet, was arrested on drug charges. At the same time, acquired Elite Models Copenhagen, which was founded in 1966 under the name Copenhagen Models by legendary scout Trice Tomsen and formally a licensee of Elite Models (now Elite Models Management Copenhagen ApS controlled together with its licenses by Elite Licensing Company SA owned by Elite World SA). After Tomsen decided to distance herself from the day to day work, she was replaced by Munir Bouylud, as the new director there. Also in 2009, Elite Models London opened nearly 20 years after its first attempt to have offices in London. It was also in 2009 that Elite Models Chicago and Atlanta severed ties with Elite World SA and were renamed Factor Women.

Acquisition by Pacific Global Management Group
In February 2011, Elite World SA shareholders elected a new Board of Directors. The new board election follows the acquisition of a controlling stake in Elite World SA by Pacific Global Management, SARL ("PGM") (now Freedom Holding, Inc.) owned by Silvio Scaglia. In 2012, Elite MM opened its branch in China with Elite Models in Shanghai immediately followed by agencies in Beijing, Shenzhen, Guang Zhou and Hong Kong.

In 2012, Elite Models Amsterdam acquired Model Masters in Amsterdam. Model Masters is best known for representing models who win Holland's Next Top Model. With that acquisition, Elite fired Ananda Marchildon for being "too fat". The company lost a breach of contract lawsuit by Ananda Marchildon and had to pay her around €65,000 damages.

In 2013, Elite World SA opened a New York division under the name The Society Management (The Society, The Society Model Management, Inc.).

Elite World Group
Elite World Group, LLC ("EWG") was created in order to hold PGM's stake in Elite World SA and EWG's branch was incorporated in New York on Jan. 28, 2019.  In 2019, Julia Haart was announced Chief Executive Officer and Chief Creative Officer of EWG which oversees Elite MM.

In 2022, Paolo Barbieri was announced Group Chief Executive Officer of Elite World Group which oversees Elite MM, The Society Management and Women Management.

Sexual assault allegations
Allegations of an "ingrained culture" of sexual assault and rape by Elite's male employees, especially its boss Gérald Marie, have dogged the agency for decades. In 1999, a BBC investigation filmed Marie saying he hoped to seduce the contestants at the annual Elite Model Look show, as well as assaulting an undercover journalist and offering her money for sex. He was temporarily suspended from Elite and in an interview at the time, said: "I'm destroyed ... I'm finished". But Elite countered with a libel action which was quietly settled with an apology from the BBC, who also agreed not to rebroadcast their documentary.

Marie was married to Linda Evangelista between 1987 and 1993, at the time of many of the alleged offences; Marie is alleged to have raped several aspiring models in their flat while Evangelista was away on assignment, including a 15-year-old girl. Supermodel and actress Carré Otis claimed in her 2011 memoir, Beauty, Disrupted, that she was raped "countless" times in the flat by Marie starting around 1986, when she was 17. Otis and others have also claimed that rape by ancillary employees, such as hairdressers and photographers, was commonplace. In October 2020, Evangelista said: “During my relationship with Gérald Marie, I knew nothing of these sexual allegations against him, so I was unable to help these women. Hearing them now, and based on my own experiences, I believe that they are telling the truth. It breaks my heart because these are wounds that may never heal, and I admire their courage and strength for speaking up today.”

Elite's activities are also alleged to have been regularly used as a "front" for "pimping out" young models to wealthy men unconnected to the modelling industry. Adnan Khashoggi, the Saudi billionaire arms dealer is said to have admitted to at least one such introduction, to a model who became one of his "harem wives". She said that in the early 1980s he routinely browsed photographic portfolios of young women, with his assistant "asking whom he would like to meet, and discussing meet-up fees of between $35,000 and $50,000."

In the wake of the MeToo movement, the allegations have increased; as of November 2020, at least 15 women have now spoken out against Marie and are cooperating in an investigation launched by French prosecutors. Marie has denied all the allegations via his lawyers and said he intends to fight any charges laid against him. Despite this, more publications are claiming his alleged sexual misconduct was an open secret for years in the fashion industry.

Gérald Marie’s contract with Elite MM ended in December 2010 and the company was sold in 2011 to its current owners Elite World Group, for whom Marie has never worked. However, since 2012 Marie has been the chairman and major shareholder of Oui Management, a prestigious Paris modelling agency.

Models
Elite Model Look "discovered" Cindy Crawford, Stephanie Seymour, Karen Mulder, Tatjana Patitz, Gisele Bündchen, Alessandra Ambrosio, Caitriona Balfe, and Lara Stone.

Elite represents, or has represented, numerous models including Diana Penty, Linda Evangelista, Naomi Campbell, Iman, Paulina Porizkova, Kendall Jenner, Irina Shayk, Adriana Lima, Adut Akech, Adesuwa Aighewi, Helena Christensen, Veronica Webb, Claudia Schiffer, Eva Herzigová, Tatiana Sorokko, Angelika Kallio, Tyra Banks, Hunter Schafer, Laura Harrier, Monica Bellucci, Anna Nicole Smith, Anna Bayle, Josephine Skriver, Heidi Klum, Camille Kostek, Jill McCormick, Karen Elson, Coco Rocha, Liu Wen, Crystal Renn, Ingrid Schram, Nina Agdal, Mariacarla Boscono, Stella Maxwell, Amber Valletta, Chloe Lloyd, Pooja Mor, Bridget Malcolm, Joséphine Le Tutour, Estelle Chen, Pauline Hoarau Vittoria Ceretti, Joanna Krupa, Huggy Ragnarsson, A'Whora, Kelly Gale, Özge Ulusoy, Hanne Gaby Odiele, Julia Saner, Olga Puchkova, Erika Lucas, Kathryn Edwards, Marta Piekarz, Jordan Rand and Aaron Philip.

From 2007–2011, the company was the official license holder to select a representative for the United States at the Miss World pageant.

See also
List of modeling agencies

References

External links

Seoul Times article about Elite contest
Elite Model Management at Fashion Model Directory
"Not A Pretty Picture At Elite" Business Week article about Elite's bankruptcy due to price fixing and abuse
Complaint of class action filed in U.S. District Court for the Southern District of New York (archived)

Modeling agencies
Entertainment companies established in 1972
French companies established in 1972
Companies based in Paris
Privately held companies of France